Paul Malcolm (born 11 December 1964) is a former English footballer who played as a goalkeeper.

References

1964 births
Living people
English footballers
Association football goalkeepers
Rochdale A.F.C. players
Doncaster Rovers F.C. players
Barnsley F.C. players
English Football League players